PRO-LAD is an analogue of LSD. It is described by Alexander Shulgin in the book TiHKAL. PRO-LAD is a psychedelic drug similar to LSD, and is around as potent as LSD itself with an active dose reported at between 100 and 200 micrograms.

Legal status
On June 10, 2014 the UK Advisory Council on the Misuse of Drugs (ACMD) recommended that PRO-LAD be specifically named in the UK Misuse of Drugs Act as a class A drug despite not identifying it as ever having been sold or any harm associated with its use. The UK Home office accepted this advice and announced a ban of the substance to be enacted on 6 January 2015 as part of The Misuse of Drugs Act 1971 (Amendment) (No. 2) Order 2014.

PRO-LAD is illegal in Switzerland as of December 2015.

Literature
 
 
 Robert C. Pfaff, Xuemei Huang, Danuta Marona-Lewicka, Robert Oberlender and David E. Nichols: Lysergamides Revisited. In: NIDA Research Monograph 146: Hallucinogens: An Update. p. 52, 1994, United States Department of Health and Human Services.

See also
 LSD (METH-LAD)
 AL-LAD
 ETH-LAD
 ALD-52

References

External links
 PRO-LAD entry in TIHKAL
 PRO-LAD entry in TiHKAL • info

Designer drugs
Lysergamides
Psychedelic drugs